Club Atlético Peñarol (usually called Peñarol de Mar del Plata or simply Peñarol) is an Argentine sports club based in Mar del Plata. The club is mostly known for its basketball team, which is currently playing in the Liga Nacional de Básquet (LNB), the top level of the Argentine league system. Their home arena is the Polideportivo Islas Malvinas.

The team had its most successful campaign during 2010, winning 5 official tournaments (FIBA Americas League, Liga Nacional, InterLigas, and Copa Argentina).

Apart from basketball, other activities held in Peñarol are football and martial arts.

Players

Current roster

Retired numbers

Notable players 

  Sergio Aispurúa (1989–91, 2002–03)
  Ariel Bernardini (1993–99)
  Billy Thompson (1997–98)
  Rodney Blake (2000–01)
  Facundo Campazzo (2008–14)
  Andrés Nocioni (2011)
  Nicolás Brussino (2015–16)
  Al Thornton (2021–present)

Head coaches
  Sergio Hernández

Titles

National
Liga Nacional (5): 1993–94, 2009–10, 2010–11, 2011–12, 2013–14
Copa Argentina (1): 2010
Torneo Súper 8 (4): 2006, 2009, 2011, 2013
Copa Desafío (2): 2007, 2010

International
FIBA Americas League (2): 2007–08, 2009–10
Torneo InterLigas (2): 2010, 2012
Campeonato Panamericano Runner-up (1): 1995

Individual accomplishments

Olympic team selection
 Leonardo Gutiérrez – 2004 , 2008 
 Sergio Hernández (coach) – 2008

References

External links
 
 Peñarol on LNB

Sport in Mar del Plata
Basketball teams in Argentina
Basketball teams established in 1922
Argentine volleyball teams
Basketball teams in Buenos Aires Province
P